Lost Freedom is a 2010 Turkish drama film, written and directed by Umur Hozatlı, about the relationship between the sister of a detained terror suspect and the son of the Turkish gendarmerie chief who has detained him. The film premiered out-of-competition at the 47th International Antalya Golden Orange Film Festival and was screened in-competition at the 22nd Ankara International Film Festival.

Release

Festival screenings 
 47th International Antalya Golden Orange Film Festival (October 9–14, 2010)
 22nd Ankara International Film Festival (March 17–27, 2011)

See also
 Turkish films of 2010

References

2010 films
2010s Turkish-language films
2010 drama films
Films shot in Turkey
Turkish drama films